The Irish League in season 1960–61 comprised 12 teams, and Linfield won the championship after a play-off with Portadown.

League standings

Results

References
Northern Ireland - List of final tables (RSSSF)

NIFL Premiership seasons
1960–61 in Northern Ireland association football
Northern